Zygolophodon is an extinct genus of mammutid proboscidean that lived from the Miocene to the Pliocene in Africa, Eurasia, and North America.

Description 
As with other mammutids, the molars have a zygodont morphology. The lower jaw is elongate and bears tusks. The upper tusks do not strongly curve upwards like in Mammut,  and do not curve greatly outwards from each other.

Taxonomy
Zygolophodon belongs in the family Mammutidae, whose best known member is the American mastodon (Mammut americanum).

The genus likely originated in Africa. The oldest species is Z. aegyptensis, known from Egypt and Namibia, dating to the late Early Miocene-early Middle Miocene. The species Z. turcensis had a widespread distribution in both Africa (Kenya, Tunisia) and Europe, dating to the Middle-Late Miocene, with its earliest appearance in Europe being approximately 18-17 million years ago. The species Z. tapiroides (Desmarets, 1822) is considered invalid. The taxonomy of East Asian Zygolophodon is uncertain. Tassy et al. (1988) synonymised many Chinese species with Z. gobiensis (including Z. lufengensis, Z. chinjiensis, Z. nemonguensis, Z. gromovae and Z. jiningensis, as well as Miomastodon tongxiensis), with Z. gobiensis also known from Mongolia, but other authors suggest that at least some of these species may be valid. The species Z. atavus is known from the early Middle Miocene of Kazakhstan, while Z. metachinjiensis is known from the mid-Late Miocene of Pakistan. An indeterminate species has also been reported from Thailand. 

Zygolophodon entered North America during the latter part of the Early Miocene (during the late Hemingfordian faunal stage), with the oldest record being a partial tooth from Massacre Lake, Nevada, dating to 16.5-16.4 million years ago. Remains of Zygolophodon are known from across western and central North America during the following Barstovian (including Colorado, California, Montana, Oregon, Nebraska, Nevada, Wyoming and Saskatchewan). Z. proavus currently represents the only known North American species of Zygolophodon. The youngest specimens of Z. proavus date to approximately 11-12 million years ago. Mammut is thought to be descended from North American populations of Zygolophodon. The species "Mammut" borsoni, which probably does not descend from North American Mammut and often placed in Zygolophodon, is the youngest member of Mammutidae in Eurasia, persisting from the Late Miocene into the Earliest Pleistocene, around 2.5-2 million years ago.

Some authors have suggested placing M. tongxinensis, Z. gobiensis and Z. metachinjiensis within a revived Miomastodon, which was originally described for the North American Miomastodon merriami. Miomastodon is usually treated as a synonym of Zygolophodon (with M. merriami typically considered a synonym of Z. proavus) and other authors have reacted with caution to the proposal.

References 

Mastodons
Miocene proboscideans
Pliocene proboscideans
Miocene mammals of North America
Miocene mammals of Asia
Miocene mammals of Europe
Pliocene mammals of North America
Pliocene mammals of Asia
Pliocene mammals of Europe
Miocene mammals of Africa
Pliocene mammals of Africa
Prehistoric placental genera
Fossil taxa described in 1877